Lepidonectes is a genus of triplefins in the family Tripterygiidae. They are found in the eastern Pacific Ocean.

Species
There are three species currently recognised within Lepidonectes:

 Twinspot triplefin, Lepidonectes bimaculata Allen & Robertson, 1992
 Signal triplefin, Lepidonectes clarkhubbsi Bussing, 1991
 Galapagos triplefin blenny, Lepidonectes corallicola (Kendall & Radcliffe, 1912)

Etymology
The generic name means "scaly swimmer" and refers to the scaled head and body and the scaled patch at the base of the pectoral fin.

References

 
Tripterygiidae